Helenium bolanderi is a North American species of flowering plant in the daisy family known by the common name coastal sneezeweed. It is native to southern Oregon and northern California as far south as Mendocino County, primarily along the seacoast.

Helenium bolanderi perennial herb sometimes as much as 140 cm (56 inches or 4 2/3 feet) in height. It has a generally unbranched, erect stem with oval-shaped leaves. The flowers arise on naked peduncles with one to three flower heads per plant. Each flower head has a fringe of 15-30 golden yellow ray florets bent backwards from a rounded center of sometimes over 1000 disc florets (yellow toward the base but brown or purple near the tips). The fruit is a tiny, hairy achene a few millimeters long.

References

External links
Jepson Manual Treatment
United States Department of Agriculture Plants Profile
Calphotos Photo gallery, University of California
Photo of herbarium specimen at Missouri Botanical Garden, collected near Humboldt Bay in 1901, isotype of Helenium bigelovii var. festivum

Flora of California
Flora of Oregon
bolanderi
Plants described in 1868
Flora without expected TNC conservation status